Van Thai Tran (born October 19, 1964) is a Vietnamese American attorney and politician in California, formerly serving as a Republican member of the California State Assembly, representing portions of Orange County.  Tran and Texas State Representative Hubert Vo were the highest-ranking Vietnamese American elected officials in U.S. history until Joseph Cao was elected to the United States House of Representatives in December 2008. Tran took office one month before Vo did, making him the first Vietnamese American to serve in a state legislature.  He served in the Assembly as Assistant Republican Leader.

Early life, education and career
Born in Saigon, South Vietnam, Tran and his family emigrated to the United States after being evacuated by the United States Army one week before the Fall of Saigon, when he was 10 years old.  After originally settling in Michigan, they moved to Orange County when Tran was a teenager.

Tran worked as an intern and later as a staff aide for Congressman Bob Dornan and for State Senator Ed Royce while a student at the University of California, Irvine, where he earned a B.A. in Political Science in 1990.  Tran completed a Master of Public Administration from Hamline University and a J.D. from Hamline University School of Law.  He was admitted to the California State Bar in 1994.

In 2000, Tran was elected to the Garden Grove City Council with the highest number of votes in city history and became only the second Vietnamese American man to be elected to office in the United States (Tony Lam was the first when he was elected to the city council of neighboring Westminster in 1992).  After serving one term on the council, he was elected to the California State Assembly to replace outgoing Republican state assemblyman Ken Maddox, who was forced to retire due to term limits. Tran was re-elected to the Assembly in 2006 and 2008.

California State Assembly
Tran represented the 68th District. He was the Vice Chair of the Assembly Judiciary Committee. He also serves on the Assembly Utilities and Commerce Committee and the Assembly Governmental Organization Committee. In June 2007, he was appointed by the Assembly Speaker as chairman of the Select Committee on International Trade.

Political campaigns

2006
On December 21, 2005, Tran announced that he would launch an exploratory committee for a 2006 run against Democratic First District Orange County Supervisor Lou Correa in the race for the State Senate seat being vacated by term limited Democrat Joe Dunn.  Tran opted not to join the race, allowing Assemblywoman Lynn Daucher to win the Republican nomination with nominal opposition, and she went on to lose the general election to Correa by a 1% margin.

On November 7, 2006, Tran was re-elected to the Assembly with 62% of the vote.

2010

Tran challenged and lost to Democratic incumbent Loretta Sanchez. Tran was endorsed by Senator John McCain.

2014
Tran announced that he would run for State Board of Equalization representing District 4.  He ran, but lost the primary to state Assemblywoman Diane Harkey, who went on to easily win the general election.

Personal life
Tran married Cindy Nguyen. He and Cindy welcomed their first child, Alexander Tran.

References

External links
Official Campaign web site
 
Financial information at OpenSecrets.org
The New Face of the Grand Old Party
Two GOP Reps. hit the road in search of candidates
 Join California Van Tran

1964 births
Asian American and Pacific Islander state legislators in California
Living people
California politicians of Vietnamese descent
California lawyers
Hamline University alumni
Republican Party members of the California State Assembly
University of California, Irvine alumni
Vietnamese emigrants to the United States
Hamline University School of Law alumni
21st-century American politicians
Asian conservatism in the United States